Niʻihau dialect is a dialect of the Hawaiian language spoken on the island of Niʻihau, more specifically in its only settlement Puʻuwai, and on the island of Kauaʻi, specifically near Kekaha, where descendants of families from Niʻihau now live. Today, the Niʻihau dialect is taught in Ke Kula Niihau O Kekaha.

Origin

Classification 
The Hawaiian language and its dialects (including Niʻihau) are a part of the Austronesian languages, which are a group of languages spoken throughout Oceania, Southeast Asia and other parts of the world. It specifically belongs to the Polynesian subbranch, which also includes languages such as Samoan, Tongan, Tahitian and Marquesan.

Extent 
Today, the families with ancestry in Niʻihau who now live on westside Kauaʻi use the same dialect as that spoken on Niʻihau, but some speakers refer to the speakers of the dialect outside of Niʻihau as speakers of Olelo Kauaʻi.

Phonology

Consonants

Some other pockets of speakers on Molokai and Maui have also been found to maintain the  variant.

This pattern of dissimilation is also extended to some loanwords.

The  allophone, represented in standard Hawaiian and the Hawaiian alphabet, is prestigious and associated with reading styles. The dissimilation pattern in colloquial Niʻihau may be due to an effort to preserve the Niʻihau dialect's distinctiveness from standard Hawaiian.

Vowels
Like the Hawaiian taught in universities, ʻŌlelo Niʻihau has five short and five long vowels, plus diphthongs.

Monophthongs

Niʻihau retains the five pure vowels characteristic of Hawaiian with few changes. Some grammatical particles vary between short and long vowels. These include a and o "of", ma "at", na and no "for".

Diphthongs

In all except perhaps , these are falling diphthongs. However, they are not as tightly bound as the diphthongs of English, and may be considered vowel sequences. (The second vowel in such sequences may receive the stress, but in such cases it is not counted as a diphthong.)

There are only a limited number of vowels which may follow long vowels, and some authors treat these sequences as diphthongs as well: .

Speech Tempo 
Research done by Newman (1951) suggests Niʻihau dialect being among the fastest spoken Hawaiian dialects. He reported a Niʻihau woman having a reading speed of 170 words per minute whereas a man from Kalapana read at a slower 120. 

The fast pace of the Niʻihau dialect causes a number of phonemic reductions. Newman lists three examples of this phenomenon:

Diacritics 
Niʻihau dialect does not use an ʻokina to represent glottal stops nor a kahakō (macron) to indicate long vowels. The Hawaiian word /ʔoːlelo/ ("language") is spelt olelo in Niʻihau and ʻōlelo in Standard Hawaiian.

References

Bibliography 

 

Hawaiian language
Niihau
Dialects
Polynesian languages
Kauai County, Hawaii